Robert Patton Bruce (January 24, 1862 – May 2, 1949) was an American politician who served as a member of the Virginia Senate.

References

External links
 
 

1862 births
1949 deaths
Democratic Party Virginia state senators
19th-century American politicians
20th-century American politicians